Blade, born Eric Cross Brooks and also known as The Daywalker, is a fictional character primarily portrayed by Wesley Snipes and Sticky Fingaz in the New Line Cinema Blade franchise, based on the Marvel Comics character of the same name created by writer Marv Wolfman and illustrator Gene Colan. Unlike the comics, in which Blade was depicted as a green-suited human immune to vampire bites, Blade is depicted as a sunglasses and leather-wearing dhampir (a vampire immune to usual vampire weaknesses at the cost of ageing normally), who gained his abilities after his mother was bitten by a vampire while giving birth to him. A variation of this storyline was integrated into Spider-Man: The Animated Series by John Semper in 1995 ahead of the first Blade (1998) film being made, adapted from an early script for the film by David S. Goyer, and was ultimately integrated into comics as well in 1999, retconning Blade's original origin; Blade's redesigned costume was also integrated. Following two further sequel films starring Snipes: Blade II (2002) and Blade: Trinity (2004), Fingaz was cast to replace him in Blade: The Series in 2006. After discussions to have Snipes reprise the role in a crossover film with the Underworld film series and the Marvel Cinematic Universe (MCU) fell through, Mahershala Ali took over the role. In October 2021, Marvel Comics writer Daniel Kibblesmith wrote one-shot The Darkhold: Blade which follows Snipes' version of the character.

Snipes' portrayal of the character received significant critical praise, described as the "quintessential black superhero [before] Black Panther", with the first film starring him receiving a cult following and beginning Marvel's film success, setting the stage for further comic book film adaptations.

Concept and creation

The character Blade made his first appearance as a supporting character in The Tomb of Dracula #10 (July 1973), written by Marv Wolfman with art by Gene Colan, his first solo story coming in the black-and-white horror-comics magazine Vampire Tales #8 (December 1974), and his first solo series (in color), Blade the Vampire Hunter, being published from July 1994 to April 1995 across ten issues, written by Ian Edginton and Terry Kavanagh, with art by Doug Wheatley.

When New World Pictures bought the rights to Marvel Comics, they were set to make a Mexico-set western starring Richard Roundtree (who would later portray Blade's father in Blade: The Series) as Blade. Marvel Studios then started to develop the film in early as 1992, when rapper/actor LL Cool J was interested in playing the lead role. Blade was eventually set up at New Line Cinema, with David S. Goyer writing the script. When Goyer heard a film was in development he went in to pitch director Ernest Dickerson. New Line originally wanted to do Blade as "something that was almost a spoof" before the writer convinced them otherwise. Goyer wanted to take the character seriously and pitched a trilogy of movies"almost Wagnerian in scope", saying that "I'm going to pitch you the Star Wars of black vampire films", wanting to demystify vampires and treat them as serious villains with a greater sense of realism instead of the doomed romantic characters shown in Anne Rice's Interview with the Vampire. Goyer's drafts early draft took a "post-modern approach" he compared to the films From Dusk till Dawn and Vampire in Brooklyn. Snipes stated that while such a character "isn’t going to lend itself to a great deal of emotional depth", there is also "some acting involved in creating the character and making him believable and palatable".

Casting

When Goyer first pitched the idea of doing a Blade film, New Line Cinemas asked that Blade and his mentor Jamal Afari both be cast as white instead of black, which Goyer rejected. While the role of Afari was redeveloped as Abraham Whistler, portrayed by white actor Kris Kristofferson, New Line head Mike DeLuca then suggested Denzel Washington, Wesley Snipes, and Laurence Fishburne for the role of Blade; of these three, only Snipes was seriously considered, and had the film's finalized script sent to, as opposed to Washington or Fishburne, who were sent earlier drafts. Having failed to get a Black Panther film starring him into production, Snipes signed on to star as Blade in 1996, the film releasing in 1998, before signing on to reprise his role in Blade II (2002) and Blade: Trinity (2004); in the former film, a young Blade is portrayed by André Hyde-Braithwaite. Kirk "Sticky Fingaz" Jones signed to star as Blade in Blade: The Series, replacing Snipes following Blade: Trinity, with Jon Kent Ethridge portraying a young Blade.

Characterization and redesign
The comic book version of Blade used teakwood knives and was much more the everyman in his behavior and attitude, wearing green armor and sporting a short afro-style haircut. Although courageous and brave, he displayed flaws as well, such as an inability to get along with certain other supporting cast members and a hatred of vampires that bordered on fanaticism. The character was not originally a "daywalker" but a human being immune to being turned into a vampire. Lacking the superhuman speed and strength of his undead quarry, he relied solely on his wits and skill. The film portrayal of Blade was updated for a 1990s audience, given a pair of sunglasses and a leather jacket, with the original comics character subsequently visually modified to match, and bitten by the character Morbius in Peter Parker: Spider-Man #8 (August 1999) to similarly make him a dhampir like his film counterpart.

Relishing the "challenge [of] stepping back into Blade's shoes" for Blade II, Snipes stated: "I love playing this role. It's fun as an actor to test your skills at doing a sequel, to see if you can recreate something that you did", with Peter Frankfurt adding that "Wesley is Blade; so much of the character was invented by Wesley and his instincts are so spot on. He takes his fighting, his weapons and attitude very seriously. He's incredibly focused, but he's also very cool and fun", and Guillermo del Toro saying that "Wesley knows Blade better than David Goyer, better than me, better than anyone else involved in the franchise, [that he] instinctively knows what the character would and wouldn't do, and every time he twists something around, something better would come out".

However, with Blade: Trinity, Snipes was unhappy with both Goyer's script and original choice of director; when Goyer was selected to replace the director, Snipes additionally protested, reportedly causing difficulty during filming, including frequently refusing to shoot scenes and forcing Goyer to use stand-ins and computer effects to add his character to scenes. Goyer described making the film as "the most personally and professionally difficult and painful thing I've ever been through". Co-star Patton Oswalt alleged that Snipes would spend much of his time smoking marijuana in his trailer, becoming violent with Goyer after accusing him of racism, and refusing to directly interact with Goyer or his co-stars outside of filming, instead communicating with them through his assistant or the use of notes. Snipes also allegedly referred to co-star Ryan Reynolds as a "cracker" on one or more occasions.
Snipes denied that version of events and said having been promoted to the role of executive producer on the film, he had the authority to make decisions but that some people had difficulty accepting that.

Addressing Blade's characterization after being cast to replace Snipes in Blade: The Series, Fingaz commented that he was not out to make people forget about the Blade films, saying that "I think it's more my own direction, but I have to incorporate some of what [Snipes] did, [which is] what people are familiar with, and you don't want to change it up drastically. You might want to change the seasoning a little bit, but you want the same meat". Goyer commented on Blade's characterisation in the series as being written as "Wiseguy with vampires", following him after "realiz[ing] at the beginning of the pilot that he's not making much headway, just sort of hacking and slashing, that he needs to know more about [vampire society's] inner workings".

Abandoned crossover and the Marvel Cinematic Universe
In October 2016, Underworld film series star Kate Beckinsale confirmed that a crossover film between Underworld and Blade had been discussed as a sequel to Blade: Trinity, with both her and Snipes returning, but was declined because Marvel Studios had plans to introduce the character into the Marvel Cinematic Universe (MCU). In May 2013, Marvel had a working script for a Blade film. Snipes said in July 2015 that he hoped to reprise the role in any future film and had been in discussions with Marvel Studios about doing so, in an adaptation of the unpublished Blade the Hunter, following Blade and his teenaged daughter Fallon Grey. At the San Diego Comic-Con 2019 held in July, Marvel Studios announced Blade reboot set in MCU, with Mahershala Ali cast as the title character, after he had personally pitched a Blade film starring himself to Kevin Feige. Marvel Comics writer Daniel Kibblesmith confirmed that his one-shot comic book The Darkhold: Blade #1 (released in October 2021), illustrated by Federico Sabbatini, Rico Renzi, and Clayton Cowles, follows Snipes' version of the character; presented as a vision given to the Blade of Earth-616 by the titular Darkhold, the narrative follows Snipes' Blade after an alternate ending to the first film where he fails to stop Deacon Frost from using La Magra to make vampires the dominant species on Earth.

Fictional character biography

Blade

In the opening scene of Blade, in 1967, a pregnant Vanessa Brooks is attacked by a vampire, causing her to go into premature labor. Doctors are able to save her baby, who she names Eric, but the woman dies of an unknown cause. Thirty years later, Eric, now named Blade, has become a vampire hunter, possessing an eidetic memory, he remembers every moment of his life, including being born. After Blade raids a Los Angeles rave club owned by the vampire Deacon Frost, police take one of the vampires he had burned to the hospital, where-to he follows to continue killing them after they awake, kill Dr. Curtis Webb and feeds on hematologist, Karen Jenson, to regain his strength, and escape from Blade. Blade takes Karen to a safe house where she is treated by his old friend, mentor, and surrogate father, Abraham Whistler, who explains that he and Blade have been waging a secret war against vampires using weapons based on their elemental weaknesses, such as sunlight, silver, and garlic. As Karen is now "marked" by the bite of a vampire to become one-herself, both he and Blade tell her to leave the city. After Karen returns to her apartment and is attacked by police officers. Blade subdues Krieger, a "familiar" (a human loyal to vampires), and uses information from him to locate an archive that contains pages from "The Book of Erebus" (the Vampire Nation's Bible). He comes upon Pearl, a morbidly obese vampire, and tortures him with a UV light into revealing that Deacon wants to command a ritual where he would use 12 pure-blood vampires to awaken the "blood god" La Magra; to which Blade's blood is the key: Blade reveals to Karen that he is a dhampir, a human-vampire hybrid possessing the supernatural abilities of the vampires without any of their weaknesses; except for the requirement to consume human blood and the ability to age normally; while Blade injects himself with a special serum that suppresses his urge to drink blood, the serum is beginning to lose its effectiveness due to overuse. Deciding to help Blade, Karen experiments with the anticoagulant EDTA as a possible replacement, finding that it explodes when combined with vampire blood and giving it to Blade to use as a weapon, while also synthesizing a vaccine that can cure the infected like her, but which will not work on Blade. Karen tells Blade that she is confident that she can cure his bloodthirst with years of treating it. However, while Blade is hunting Frost's forces, Frost and his men attack his hideout, infect Whistler, and abduct Karen. When Blade returns, he reluctantly helps Whistler commit suicide.

When Blade attempts to rescue Karen from Frost's penthouse, he is shocked to find his still-alive mother, who reveals that she came back the night she was attacked and was brought in by Frost, who appears and reveals himself as the vampire who bit her and responsible for Blade's existence. Blade is subdued and taken to the Temple of Eternal Night, where Frost plans to perform the summoning ritual for La Magra, draining him of his blood. Karen, after escaping her bonds, frees Blade and allows him to drink her blood, enabling him to recover and providing him more power than he has ever had. As Frost completes the ritual and obtains the powers of La Magra, Blade confronts him after killing all of his minions, including his own mother. During their fight, Blade injects Frost with all of the syringes, and the overdose of EDTA causes his body to inflate and explode, killing him.

Karen offers to help Blade cure himself at the cost off his abilities, instead, he asks her to create an improved version of the serum, so he can continue his crusade against vampires. In an deleted cliffhanger ending while still atop the roof with Karen, Blade sees another Daywalker, Michael Morbius, staring at him from another building, and leaves Karen behind in order to face them. In the theatrical ending, set months later, Blade prepares to kill another vampire in Moscow.

Blade II film

Two years later, Blade searches Prague for Whistler, having found out that he had survived his suicide attempt, turned into a vampire, and held prisoner for two years by former followers of Frost. Rescuing Whistler and curing him using a long and arduous method of blood transference, Blade introduced him to Scud, Blade's young new technician and stoner. Subsequently, vampire overlord Eli Damaskinos sends his minion, Asad, and daughter Nyssa to strike a temporary truce with Blade, informing him of a pandemic that has been turning vampires into "Reapers", primal, mutant creatures with a ravenous thirst for blood and a highly infectious bite that transforms both human and vampire alike into them. Admitting that they now have a common enemy, Blade reluctantly allies with the vampires, teaming up with the Bloodpack, an elite group of vampires originally assembled to kill him, one member of which, Reinhardt, who particularly hates Blade and challenges to fight, Blade has Scud implant an explosive in his head to keep him in line, while growing close with Nyssa a natural-born vampire and Damaskinos' daughter, who has never killed a human.

In a battle with Reapers in a vampire nightclub, Blade discovers that like him, they are immune to most vampire weaknesses. The Reaper leader, Jared Nomak, arrives and holds Nyssa hostage, before attempting to recruit Blade to his cause, citing their mutual hatred of vampires. After several of the Bloodpack's members are killed, Blade fights Nomak, who he finds is immune to his weapons. As the sun rises, Nomak retreats and Whistler returns, revealing that he has found the Reaper nest in the sewer, which Blade and the Bloodpack proceed to; several of their members are killed by a Reaper horde before Blade saves Nyssa and uses the UV-bomb to kill all of the Reapers except for Nomak. Nyssa is seriously injured until Blade allows her to drink his blood to survive. After Reinhardt and Damaskinos' forces betray and capture Blade, Whistler, Nyssa, and Scud, it is revealed that the Reapers exist as a result of Damaskinos' efforts to engineer a stronger breed of vampires and make daywalkers like Blade: Nomak, the first Reaper, is his own son, whom Damaskinos considers a failure due to his weakness to sunlight. Scud reveals himself to be one of Damaskinos' familiars, but Blade, who already suspected this, kills him with the explosive he planted on Reinhardt earlier. After Damaskinos reveals that he plans to harvest Blade's blood in order to perfect his experiments and give himself immunity to sunlight and create a new and entirely invincible breed of vampires, Whistler escapes and frees Blade, almost drained of blood, causing him to fall into Damaskinos' blood pool, restoring his strength and allowing him to fight his way through Damaskinos' henchmen and kill Reinhardt. After Nyssa betrays her father to her brother, furious at him for hiding his existence, Nomak then bites Nyssa, drinking her blood, before engaging Blade in battle and stabbing Nomak in his only weak spot. With his revenge complete, and wanting to end his suffering, Nomak kills himself with Blade's sword. Fulfilling Nyssa's wish of dying as a vampire, Blade takes her outside and embraces her as her body disintegrates due to the rising sun.

Blade II video game

Six months after the events of the Blade II film, Blade having vanquished Nomak and the Reapers, the Blade II video game opens with Blade and Whistler receiving information of a blood exchange taking place between a mafia outfit and a vampire clan in the parking lot of Karkov Towers, a multi-company tower block and possible vampire safe house. Blade arrives just in time to see the exchange, with a suited vampire disappearing into the tower carrying a briefcase, and is told by Whistler that the briefcase contains a vial of DNA and must be recovered. After fighting his way into the tower through the underground car park, and passing through the "Exploitika" nightclub, Blade destroys the computer mainframe of a vampire-run company called Nth Phase. Finding the vampire with the briefcase, Blade learns that the DNA is actually that of Damaskinos, former overlord of the Vampire Nation, and a DNA sequencer is currently unraveling the DNA. Blade is able to destroy the machine and then meets Whistler on the roof, giving him a canister of poison, which Blade puts into the ventilation system, killing every vampire in the building.

Upon returning to their base, Blade and Whistler discover that their ally, Dr. Grant, has been kidnapped by the Byron vampire clan. Following her GPS signal to a subway station, Blade fights his way through the vampires into the sewers, where he is joined by Whistler, who plants a series of explosives which Blade detonates, following the sewers to Gaunt Moor Asylum, where the Byrons have taken Grant. After rescuing her, Blade learns from her that the vampires are torturing humans so as to capture "dark energy" as part of an experiment called "Project: Vorpal". After escorting her out of the building, Blade returns to investigate Vorpal, discovering that are using the dark energy to attempt to create a super vampire warrior much stronger than Reapers. Although he is able to destroy the incubation chamber, Blade learns from Grant and then reveals the Arcan clan is the one behind the project, not the Byrons, and infiltrates their mountain base to destroy their dark energy storage chambers. After meeting up with Grant and escorting her to the dark energy receiver so she can take it offline, he is unable to prevent her from being caught in an explosion and mortally wounded. As Grant dies, she tells Blade to destroy the core; upon heading there, meeting up with Whistler, the duo plant a series of bombs before fleeing the base and remotely setting off the explosions, destroying the core and putting an end to Project: Vorpal.

Blade: Trinity

After Blade is framed for countless murders by the vampire leader Danica Talos, by tricking him into killing familiars he thought were vampires, his existence is exposed to the public and FBI agents locate and raid his hideout, apparently killing Whistler. Demoralized, Blade surrenders and is arrested. After familiars embedded in the FBI attempt to hand him over to their vampire masters, Blade is rescued by Hannibal King and Abigail Whistler, Whistler's daughter, who invite Blade to join their band of vampire hunters, the Nightstalkers, which Whistler had secretly founded without Blade's knowledge. From them, Blade learns that Danica, an old enemy of King, has revived Dracula "Drake", supposedly the first vampire and a daywalker like Blade, with the goal of using his powers to cure vampires of their weaknesses. In addition to being equipped by the Nightstalkers with their newly-innovative ultraviolet "Sun dog" ammunition, Blade learns that they have created an experimental bioweapon known as Daystar, capable of killing vampires at the genetic level and that they believe if they can infect Drake, the virus will kill him and ensure the rest of the species is wiped out, including Blade.

Eager to test Blade, Drake isolates him from the Nightstalkers and explains his view that what he has seen of modern humans and vampires are inferior in his eyes and that he intends to wipe them from the Earth, requesting his assistance in doing so, before leading him to a vampire compound where Abigail and Blade find evidence of the vampires' plans for human subjugation, as well as a network of "blood farms" where brain dead humans are drained of their blood for vampire consumption. Blade deactivates the farm's life support systems and executes the familiar who had been rounding up homeless humans for vampire consumption.

Returning to the Nightstalkers' hideout, Abigail and Blade find all of them dead except for King and a young girl, Zoe, both of whom have been taken captive by Danica's forces. After arriving to Danica's base and freeing them, Blade enters into combat with Drake; losing, he prepares to kill him with his own sword. After Abigail fires an arrow containing the Daystar virus at him, Drake catches it and drops it to the floor by Blade, not realizing the danger it poses to him. After Abigail shoots Drake with another arrow, wounding him, Blade uses the distraction to stab Drake with the Daystar arrow, triggering a chemical reaction that completes the "Daystar" virus, releasing it into the air and killing Danica and the rest of the vampires. As Drake slowly succumbs to his wounds and the virus, he praises Blade for fighting honorably, but warns him that he will eventually succumb to his need for blood, thus proving that Blade is the future of the vampire race. Using the last of his power, Drake shapeshifts into Blade. The FBI recover the body, but as they begin the autopsy, it transforms back into the deceased Drake. King narrates that Drake's final transformation was gift so that Blade could escape, leaving Blade free to continue fighting his never-ending war against the forces of evil. In a post-credits scene, Blade drives in his bike, heading to places unknown.

In the unrated extended edition, Drake's body in the morgue (in Blade's form) does not transform back into Drake; instead, "Blade" awakens as his autopsy begins and attacks the doctors and FBI agents present, before menacingly approaches a cowering orderly, while King narrates that the virus did not kill the real Blade as the human half of his heart did not stop beating, it only slowed down, causing him to enter into a comatose state until his body was ready to fight again.

Blade: House of Chthon

In Blade: House of Chthon, the two-hour television film pilot for Blade: The Series, Blade reluctantly joins forces with the ruthless and beautiful Iraq war veteran Krista Starr, the twin sister of Zack, a familiar murdered by his master Marcus Van Sciver, who apparently plans to develop a vaccine to make those of his kind who survived the Daystar virus indestructible by turning them all into Daywalkers like Blade. Forced to accommodate Krista's need for revenge, Blade also continues to keep his own bloodsucking tendencies in check through daily injections of a new special serum, seeking to counteract the damage left by Drake. After Marcus, smitten with Krista, injects her with his blood to turn her into a vampire, Krista is approached by Blade, who injects her with his own serum and offers her a chance to help him avenge her brother's death and bring down Marcus and the House of Chthon by going undercover in Marcus' organization: Zack is revealed to have been doing a sting operation with Blade. The two form a reluctant partnership.

Blade: The Series

Following on from Blade: House of Chthon, the events of Blade: The Series follow Blade as he hunts various vampires within and without the House of Chthon, reluctantly reconnects with his estranged biological father Robert, and serves as Krista's handler as she works undercover and struggles to deal with her own hunger for blood and growing predatory nature. Ultimately, Blade discovers that Marcus believes in peace between humans and vampires, believing that they can survive without needing to kill, and that the "vaccine" is actually a virus called the Aurora Project that will specifically target the ruling vampire class of "purebloods", leaving "turnbloods" (normal vampires like Marcus and Krista, who were once human) unscathed. With Blade's help, he eventually unleashes his weapon in the series finale, and Blade looks on at a world finally at peace.

The Darkhold: Blade

In The Darkhold: Blade, a one-shot following an alternate ending to Blade (1998), Blade fails to kill Deacon Frost before he succeeds in his plan to use La Magra, creating the "V-Wave", which immediately transforms billions worldwide into vampires (including many of Earth's superhumans), leaving the remainders of humanity divided between vampires and their dwindling food supply. While Blade continues his hunt, becoming known as a "boogeyman" to the vampire underworld, killing vampire and familiar alike, his former vampire ally Amadeus Cho is kidnapped by a collection of vampiric former Avengers and returned to the custody of his former master Wilson Fisk, the current "undisputed vampire king of New York City" (who now resembles Pearl). After Amadeus' interrogation by Fisk is interrupted by the failed attack of "the Last Avengers", led by Blade, Blade unleashes an aerosolized silver gas attack upon his penthouse, killing the Kingpin, the Avengers and all other vampires within, before succeeding him as "the king of the vampires".

Appearances
Blade is portrayed by Wesley Snipes in three feature films: Stephen Norrington's Blade (1998), Guillermo del Toro's Blade II (2002), and David S. Goyer's Blade: Trinity (2004), and by Sticky Fingaz in the television series Blade: The Series, debuting with television film Blade: House Of Chthon on June 28, 2006, and concluding with its thirteenth episode, "Conclave", on September 13.

Video games
Snipes' Blade appears in several video games based on the film series: Blade, a prequel of the first film published and released by Activision in 2000, with a separate game released for the Game Boy Color later that year, voiced by Redd Pepper, Blade II, released for the PlayStation 2 and Xbox on September 3, 2002 (unlike the other Blade video games, it is a narrative sequel to the film of the same name, taking place between the events of Blade II and Blade: Trinity, in which Blade is voiced by Tom Clarke Hill), and Blade: Trinity, a tie-in Java mobile game starring the character and adapting the film of the same name, developed by Mforma and released in December 2004.

Other works
Snipes' Blade has appeared in three segments of the parody series Robot Chicken, voiced by Jordan Peele. In "Sesame Street Rave", a parody of the opening scene of Blade, Blade rescues Alex from a rave attended by the cast of Sesame Street, turned into vampires by Count von Count, before killing them all. In "Bob Barker's New Gig", a retired Bob Barker (voiced by Jonathan Lipow) dresses as Snipes' Blade to become a vigilante, spaying and neutering all pets in the city in a parody of Blade, concluding with Snoop Dogg, a werewolf. In "Blade's Blades", Blade kills two vampires before pinning a third to a wall in order to give him a sales pitch to buy "Blade's Blades" (a variety of specialised knives) from him as part of a multi-level marketing scheme, under the justification that merely being a vampire hunter doesn't pay his bills, before demonstrating his knives' capabilities by using them to block bullets shot by a gun. Impressed, the pinned vampire offers to buy two knives, asking whether or not Blade takes Discover; although insulted, Blade admits that he does, and accepts the payment.

Reception
Snipes' portrayal of the character received significant critical praise, with the first film starring him receiving a cult following and the beginning of Marvel's film success, setting the stage for further comic book film adaptations.

See also
 Blade (Marvel Cinematic Universe)

References

External links 
 

American male characters in television
African-American superheroes
Black characters in films
Characters created by David S. Goyer
Fictional blade and dart throwers
Fictional capoeira practitioners
Fictional characters from New York City
Fictional characters with slowed ageing
Fictional characters with superhuman senses
Fictional half-vampires
Fictional hapkido practitioners
Fictional Jeet Kune Do practitioners
Fictional karateka
Fictional kenjutsuka
Fictional knife-fighters
Fictional matricides
Fictional swordfighters
Fictional vampire hunters
Fictional vigilantes
Fictional wushu practitioners
Film characters introduced in 1998
Male characters in film
Marvel Comics characters who can move at superhuman speeds
Marvel Comics characters with accelerated healing
Marvel Comics characters with superhuman strength
Marvel Comics film characters
Marvel Comics hybrids
Marvel Comics martial artists
Marvel Comics television characters
Marvel Comics vampires
Orphan characters in film
Blade (franchise)